Come Here may refer to:

Come Here (Cass Fox album)
Come Here (KAT-TUN album)
"Come Here", song by Masta Wu

See also
 C'mere, song by Interpol